Jacob Beeson Blair (April 11, 1821 – February 12, 1901) was a U.S. Representative from Virginia and from West Virginia, and later a justice of the Wyoming Supreme Court.

Life and career
Born in Parkersburg, West Virginia (then Virginia), Blair studied law and was admitted to the bar in 1844. He was a lawyer in private practice and served as prosecuting attorney, Ritchie County, West Virginia (then Virginia as well).

Blair was elected as a Unionist from Virginia to the Thirty-seventh Congress to fill the vacancy caused by the resignation of United States Representative John S. Carlile. Blair served in this capacity from December 2, 1861 to March 3, 1863. He was then elected as an Unconditional Unionist from West Virginia to the Thirty-eighth Congress (December 7, 1863 – March 3, 1865).

He was United States Minister to Costa Rica from 1868 to 1873. He later served as associate justice of the Supreme Court of Wyoming from 1876 to 1888. He was a probate judge for Salt Lake County, Utah from 1892 to 1895, and surveyor general of Utah from 1897 to 1901. He died in Salt Lake City and was interred in Mount Olive Cemetery there.

See also
United States congressional delegations from West Virginia

Sources

1821 births
1901 deaths
Politicians from Parkersburg, West Virginia
Unionist Party members of the United States House of Representatives from Virginia
Unconditional Union Party members of the United States House of Representatives from West Virginia
Virginia Unionists
West Virginia Unconditional Unionists
19th-century American diplomats
People from Ritchie County, West Virginia
Virginia lawyers
County and city Commonwealth's Attorneys in Virginia
19th-century American politicians
Ambassadors of the United States to Costa Rica
Justices of the Wyoming Supreme Court
19th-century American judges
Members of the United States House of Representatives from West Virginia
Members of the United States House of Representatives from Virginia